Delissa Anne Ridgway (born June 28, 1955) is a senior United States Judge of the United States Court of International Trade.

Biography

Ridgway was born in 1955 in Kirksville, Missouri. She received a Bachelor of Arts degree in 1975 from the University of Missouri in Columbia, Missouri. She received a Juris Doctor in 1979 from the Northeastern University School of Law. She served as a law clerk for Judge June Lazenby Green of the United States District Court for the District of Columbia in 1979. She served in private practice from 1979 to 1994. She worked as an adjunct professor at the Washington College of Law at American University from 1992 to 1994. She served as Chair of the United States Foreign Claims Settlement Commission from 1994 to 1998.

Trade Court service

On January 27, 1998, President Bill Clinton nominated Ridgway to serve as a United States Judge of the United States Court of International Trade, to the seat vacated by Judge Nicholas Tsoucalas. She was confirmed by the Senate on March 11, 1998 and received her commission on March 17, 1998. She assumed senior status on January 31, 2019.

References

External links
 
 Judge Delissa A. Ridgway Biography on U.S. Court of International Trade website

1955 births
Living people
American women judges
Judges of the United States Court of International Trade
Northeastern University School of Law alumni
People from Kirksville, Missouri
University of Missouri alumni
Washington College of Law faculty
American women legal scholars
American legal scholars
20th-century American women judges
20th-century American judges
21st-century American women judges
21st-century American judges
American women academics
21st-century American women
United States federal judges appointed by Bill Clinton